Basketball at the 1936 Summer Olympics was the first appearance of the sport of basketball as an official Olympic medal event.  The tournament was played between 7 August and 14 August 1936 in Berlin, Germany.  23 nations entered the competition, making basketball the largest tournament of the team sports, but Hungary and Spain withdrew, meaning 21 competed.

The IOC and International Basketball Federation, which is the governing body of international basketball, used the 1936 tournament to experiment with outdoor basketball.  Lawn and dirt tennis courts were used for the competition, but this caused problems when the weather was adverse, especially during the final of the tournament.

The medals were awarded by James Naismith, the inventor of basketball.  The United States won its first gold medal, while Canada and Mexico won silver and bronze, their only medals in basketball, as of 2020.

Medalists

Note: The International Olympic Committee medal database shows only these players as medalists. They all played at least one match during the tournament. The reserve players are not listed as medalists.

Results

Brackets

Third round onwards

Fifth-place classification

First round
Winners advanced to the second round, while losers competed in the first consolation round for another chance to move on.

First consolation round
Winners returned to the main competition for the second round, while losers were eliminated.

 Uruguay 17–10 Belgium
 China 45–38 France
 Egypt 33–23 Turkey
Byes: Brazil, Germany and Poland

Second round
Winners advanced to the third round.  Losers competed in the second consolation round for another chance to move on.

 Philippines 32–30 Mexico
 Japan 43–31 Poland
 Uruguay 36–23 Egypt
 Peru 29–21 China 
 United States 52–28 Estonia
 Italy 58–16 Germany
 Switzerland 25–12 Czechoslovakia
 Chile 23–18 Brazil
 Canada 34–23 Latvia

Second consolation round
 Poland def. Latvia, 28–23
 Brazil def. China, 32–14
 Mexico def. Egypt, 32–10
 Czechoslovakia def. Germany, 20–9
Bye: Estonia

Third round
The third round was the first to cause automatic elimination for losers, with no consolation round.  Winners advanced to the quarterfinals.

Byes: United States and Peru

Quarterfinals
Winners of the quarterfinals advanced to the medals round, with losers playing in classification matches.

 United States 56–23 Philippines
 Mexico 24–17 Italy
 Canada 41–21 Uruguay

Bye: Poland (Peru abandoned the Olympic Games to protest the actions of the German authorities in the football tournament).

Classification 5–8

Preliminary match
 Philippines 32–14 Italy
Bye: Uruguay (Peru abandoned competition - see above).

Fifth place match
 Philippines 33–23 Uruguay

Medals round

Semifinals

Bronze medal match

Final

The final was played in driving rain, turning the court into a quagmire such that it was impossible to dribble, while the conditions kept scoring to a minimum: highest scorer in the game was Joe Fortenberry of the United States, with seven points. In addition, almost all of the nearly 1,000 in attendance had to stand in the rain throughout the final as there were virtually no seats for spectators.

Awards

Participating nations
For the team rosters see: Basketball at the 1936 Summer Olympics – Men's team squads.

Each country was allowed to enter one team of 14 players and they all were eligible for participation; however, only seven were allowed to dress for competition at any one game.

A total of 199(*) basketball players from 21 nations competed at the Berlin Games:

 
 
 
 
 
 
 
 
 
 
 
 
 
 
 
 
 
 
 
 
 

Hungary and Spain withdrew before playing a match.

(*) NOTE: There are only players counted, which participated in one game at least.

Not all reserve players are known.

Summary

Note: Hungary and Spain withdrew before competition started

References

 
basketball
1936
1936 in basketball
International basketball competitions hosted by Germany